Destructor was a 19th-century Spanish warship. She was a fast ocean-going torpedo gunboat and the main precursor of the destroyer type of vessel. Destructor was the first warship classified as a "destroyer" at the time of her commissioning. Her designer was a Spanish Navy officer, Fernando Villaamil, commissioned by the Minister of the Navy, Vice-Admiral Manuel Pezuela.

Genesis
During the 1860s, 1870s and 1880s the rapidly improving, fast and cheap torpedo boats were presenting an escalating threat to major warships. Escort vessels were already in use to provide protection for battleships but it was decided that what was needed was a new type of enlarged and fast torpedo boat, capable of escorting larger ships on long voyages and also able to attack enemy battleships with torpedoes as part of a fleet action.

The Spanish Navy asked several British shipyards to submit proposals capable of fulfilling these specifications. In 1885 it chose the design submitted by the shipyard of James and George Thomson of Clydebank, near the Yarrow shipyards. The vessel was laid down at the end of the year, launched in 1886, and commissioned in 1887.

Characteristics

She was armed with one 90mm (3.5 in) Spanish-designed Hontoria breech-loading gun, four  (6 pdr) Nordenfeldt guns, two  Hotchkiss revolving cannons and two  torpedo tubes  . The ship carried three Schwartzkopff torpedoes per tube. She was manned by a crew of 60. On her maiden voyage, Destructor established a record after steaming from Falmouth to Ferrol in 24 hours.

In terms of gunnery, speed and dimensions, the specialised design to chase torpedo boats and her high seas capabilities, Destructor is widely considered the first torpedo-boat destroyer ever built, and was described as such by British naval engineer Sir William Henry White. Destructor is thought to have influenced the design and concept of later destroyers developed by the British Royal Navy. The aim of the new destroyer design was not only to neutralize the torpedo boat as an effective weapon, but also to replace it as a faster and more reliable torpedo-carrying warship.

Notes

References
 Cheseneau, R & Kolesnik, E (Eds). Conway's All the World's Fighting Ships 1860–1905, Conway Maritime Press, 1979. 
 Lyon, David. The First Destroyers, Chatham Shipshape Series, London, 1997.

External links
 

Destroyers of the Spanish Navy
Ships built on the River Clyde
Science and technology in Spain
1886 ships